Fang Xiaoru (1357–1402), courtesy name Xizhi (希直) or Xigu (希古), was a Chinese politician and Confucian scholar of the Ming dynasty. He was an orthodox Confucian scholar-bureaucrat, famous for his continuation of the Jinhua school of Zhu Xi and later for his loyalty to his former pupil, the Jianwen Emperor (Zhu Yunwen), who died in the rebellion of the Prince of Yan (Jingnan rebellion).

Service to Zhu Yunwen and defiance to Zhu Di 
During the Jingnan rebellion, Fang served as one of the Jianwen Emperor's closest advisors. After Zhu Di, the Prince of Yan, usurped the throne to become the Yongle Emperor in 1402, he summoned Fang Xiaoru, who was famed for his connection to Song Lian and the scholars of the Jinhua school as well as for his own talent and lucid composition. He demanded Fang write an inaugural address that would compare his usurpation of the throne with the regency of the Duke of Zhou during the reign of his nephew King Cheng of Zhou in ancient China. Fang refused, retorting "Then where is King Cheng?" 

Zhu replied, "He was killed by his own fire." 

Fang continued to press the issue, asking Zhu, "Why not enthrone King Cheng's son?" 

Zhu answered, "The country requires a mature ruler." 

Fang again asked, "What about the Emperor's brother?" 

Zhu answered: "That is my family matter. The address must be written by you." 

Fang then wrote on the paper Zhu provided the words "燕賊篡位" ("The Bandit of Yan is a usurper"). 

Threatened with the execution of nine kinship, Fang Xiaoru is reported saying: "莫說九族，十族何妨" ("Never mind nine agnates; I am fine with ten!"). 

He was granted his wish with perhaps the only officially designated case of an "extermination of ten degrees of kinship" in the history of China. In addition to his own execution, his blood relations and their spouses were killed along with all of his students and peers as the 10th group. Altogether, 873 people are said to have been executed.

Before death, Fang Xiaoru was forced to watch his brother's execution. Fang Xiaoru himself was executed by "waist severing". The legend goes that prior to his death, he dipped his finger in his own blood and wrote on the ground the Chinese character "篡" (cuàn), meaning "usurper".

Legacy 
People in Fujian (闽南人) regard Fang Xiaoru, along with Tie Xuan and Jing Qing (景清), as the Sanfu Qiansui (三府千岁) deities in the Wang Ye worship (王爷神). Fang Xiaoru, Tie Xuan, and Jing Qing were all executed by Zhu Di during the Ming dynasty.

Gallery

References

1357 births
1402 deaths
15th-century executions by China
Executed people from Zhejiang
Ming dynasty scholars
People executed by cutting in half
Politicians from Ningbo
Victims of familial execution